Heterodactyla hemprichii is a species of sea anemone in the family Thalassianthidae,  and was first formally described in 1834 by Christian Gottfried Ehrenberg.

This sea anemone does not host any varieties of clownfish, but has been associated with some species of commensal anemone shrimp. This is a medium to large species of anemone characterized by "bunches of grape-like nematospheres," radially arranged, and densest on the outermost edges of its oral disc.

References

Animals described in 1834
Thalassianthidae
Taxa named by Christian Gottfried Ehrenberg